Things to Do Before You're 30 is a 2005 British film directed by Simon Shore. Its plot concerns a group of twenty-something friends trying desperately to hang onto the friendship of their youth while the responsibility of adulthood is tearing them in different directions. It was written by Patrick Wilde, based on the 1997 Dutch feature film, All Stars, written by Mischa Alexander and Jean van de Velde.

Things to Do Before You're 30 is set in Greenwich, London with a large ensemble cast including Dougray Scott, Emilia Fox, Billie Piper, Jimi Mistry, Shaun Parkes, Bruce Mackinnon, George Innes, George Irving, Rosie Cavaliero, Nina Young, Danny Nussbaum, David Paul West & Neil McGuinness.

Synopsis
In 1983 Don Robson (George Innes) started a boys football team called Athletico Greenwich. Twenty years later six of the lads are still playing for the team, but things have become so much more complicated.

Cass (Dougray Scott), the team's top scorer on and off the pitch, isn't sure he's ready for fatherhood with Kate (Emilia Fox), the love of his life. Adam (Shaun Parkes) still hasn't told the rest of the team he's gay. Colin (Bruce Mackinnon) is desperate to have a threesome even though he's just started going out with the lovely Vicky (Billie Piper). Dylan (Jimi Mistry) is in love with the woman his father is about to marry. Billy (Roger Morlidge) is trying to save his marriage. Johnny (Danny Nussbaum) is not ready to accept the fact that his father, who started the team all those years ago, is dying.

Whilst it is the Sunday football team that keeps this group of friends together, this is not a film about football. This is a film about complex relationships, and how childhood friends have to change as they mature.

Reception 
The film premiered at the Cannes Film Festival in 2004, and received largely negative reviews, with Channel 4 Film calling it a "charmless film full of gender clichés and lumpen dialogue," and adding "Not one to put on your 'things to do' list."

References

External links

Things to Do Before You're 30 at Britfilms.com

2005 films
British comedy-drama films
Remakes of Dutch films
Films set in London
2000s English-language films
Films directed by Simon Shore
2000s British films